Volleyball was contested at the 2017 Summer Universiade from 20 to 29 August in Taipei, Taiwan.

Medal summary

Medal table

Medal events

Men

22 teams participated in the men's tournament.

Teams

Pool A

Pool B

Pool C

Pool D

Women

16 teams participated in the women's tournament.

Teams

Pool A

Pool B

Pool C

Pool D

References

External links
2017 Summer Universiade – Volleyball
Result book – Volleyball

 
2017
U
2017 Summer Universiade events